The football competition at the 1991 European Youth Olympic Days was held from 18 to 20 July. The events took place in Brussels, Belgium. Boys  born 1976 or 1977 or later participated in the event. No girls event was held.

Format

Seven teams entered the event, which was played in an uneven format. In the first preliminary round three teams played a round robin format, with two teams proceeding to the semifinals. The other four teams played a pair of straight quarterfinals, with the winners joining the other two teams in the semifinals. The three teams that failed to reach the semifinals played a further round robin series to establish 5th, 6th and 7th places.

Participating nations

GROUP A

 
 
 

GROUP B

Preliminary round

Group A

Ireland, Luxembourg and the Netherlands played a round robin series in this half of the draw.

Group B

Four teams in this pool played a single pair of knockout matches, with the winners qualifying for the semifinals.

Semifinals

5th–7th Playoff

Bronze medal match

Gold medal match

Medal summary

Men

References

1991 European Youth Olympic Days
1991 in association football